Hoplolatilus starcki, Stark's tilefish, purple-headed sand tilefish or bluehead tilefish, is a species of marine ray-finned fish, a tilefish belonging to the family Malacanthidae. This species is native to the central Indo-Pacific.

Description
The adults are yellowish-brown to greenish changing to yellow posteriorly. The lobes of the caudal fin are wide and yellow in colour while the head and the bases of the pectoral fins are vivid blue. The juveniles are overall sky blue in colour. The dorsal fin contains 8 spines and 21-23 soft rays while the anal fin has 2 spines and 15-16 soft rays. the caudal fin is forked.

Distribution
Hoplolatilus starcki is found in the Indo-West Pacific where its range extends from Bali in Indonesia, the Philippines and Timor, north to the Marianas Islands south to Australia and New Caledonia and east to Micronesia. It has been recorded at Pitcairn Island. In Australia this species can be found at Rowley Shoals, the Great Barrier Reef and reefs in the Coral Sea.

Habitat and biology
Hoplolatilus starcki is normally found in areas of scree and rubble on the steep outer reef slopes. They live in pairs which have a burrow to which they rapidly escape, diving headfirst into it, if spooked. The juveniles have been recorded schooling alongside the juvenile amethyst anthias (Pseudanthis osculum), which have a similar colouration. It feeds on zooplankton.

Systematics

Etymology
The specific name honours the American marine biologist Dr Walter A Starck II.<ref name = ETYFish>{{cite web | url = https://etyfish.org/eupercaria/ | title =Series EUPERCARIA (Incertae sedis): Families CALLANTHIIDAE, CENTROGENYIDAE, DINOLESTIDAE, DINOPERCIDAE, EMMELICHTHYIDAE, MALACANTHIDAE, MONODACTYLIDAE, MORONIDAE, PARASCORPIDIDAE, SCIAENIDAE and SILLAGINIDAE | work = The ETYFish Project Fish Name Etymology Database | accessdate = 15 March 2021 | date = 18 September 2020 | author1 = Christopher Scharpf | author2 = Kenneth J. Lazara | name-list-style = amp | publisher = Christopher Scharpf and Kenneth J. Lazara}}</ref>

UtilisationHoplolatilus starcki'' is occasionally found in the aquarium trade.

References

External links
 

starcki
Taxa named by John Ernest Randall
Taxa named by James Keith Dooley
Fish described in 1974